Micralictoides is a genus of sweat bees in the family Halictidae. There are about eight described species in Micralictoides.

Species
These eight species belong to the genus Micralictoides:
 Micralictoides altadenae (Michener, 1937)
 Micralictoides chaenactidis Bohart & Griswold, 1987
 Micralictoides dinoceps Bohart & Griswold, 1987
 Micralictoides grossus Bohart & Griswold, 1987
 Micralictoides linsleyi Bohart & Griswold, 1987
 Micralictoides mojavensis Bohart, 1942
 Micralictoides quadriceps Bohart & Griswold, 1987
 Micralictoides ruficaudus (Michener, 1937)

References

Further reading

 

Halictidae
Articles created by Qbugbot